Kiskunmajsa is a town in Bács-Kiskun county, Hungary.

Twin towns – sister cities

Kiskunmajsa is twinned with:

 Bačka Topola, Serbia
 Bad Schönborn, Germany
 Baiyin, China
 Gheorgheni, Romania
 Lommatzsch, Germany
 Lubliniec, Poland
 Ukmergė, Lithuania

Gallery

References

External links

  in Hungarian

Populated places in Bács-Kiskun County
Towns in Hungary